Le Parc is a commune in the department of Manche, northwestern France. The municipality was established on 1 January 2016 by merger of the former communes of Braffais, Plomb and Sainte-Pience (the seat).

See also 
Communes of the Manche department

References 

Communes of Manche
Populated places established in 2016
2016 establishments in France